Kenneth William Blaxter CMG (1 September 1895 - 3 April 1964) was a British civil servant, Assistant Secretary to the Colonial Office from 1942 to 1956.

References 

1895 births
1964 deaths
Companions of the Order of St Michael and St George
Civil servants in the Colonial Office